Júnior Exequiel Morales Maradiaga (born 23 March 1978 in San Pedro Sula, Honduras) is a Honduran footballer who currently plays as goalkeeper for Liga Nacional de Honduras club Atlético Choloma.

Club career
A much-travelled goalkeeper, Morales played for several clubs before joining Platense for the 2008 Clausura championship. In October 2008, Morales was dismissed by Platense during the 2008 Apertura season. At the end of 2008 he joined Vida but in May 2009, the club announced Morales would leave the club.

Victoria
On 1 July 2010, Júnior Morales moved to Victoria replacing John Bodden, who moved to Necaxa, signing a one-year contract.

On 21 August 2010, Morales made his domestic league debut with Victoria in a 1–1 in the Clásico Ceibeño against Vida.

International career
Morales made his debut for Honduras in a March 2001 friendly match against Peru and has earned a total of 8 caps, scoring no goals. He has represented his country at the 2001 UNCAF Nations Cup, as well as at the 2005 CONCACAF Gold Cup.

His final international was a September 2005 friendly match against Japan.

Personal life
Morales is married to Katherine and the couple have two children, Pedro and Katherine. Morales has two other kids named Junior Alexander y Daniel Alejandro..

References

External links

 Profile - Diez

1978 births
Living people
People from San Pedro Sula
Association football goalkeepers
Honduran footballers
Honduras international footballers
2001 UNCAF Nations Cup players
2005 UNCAF Nations Cup players
2005 CONCACAF Gold Cup players
Real C.D. España players
Platense F.C. players
Hispano players
Deportes Savio players
C.D.S. Vida players
C.D. Victoria players
Atlético Choloma players
Liga Nacional de Fútbol Profesional de Honduras players